Sarbsk is a village in the administrative district of Gmina Wicko, within Lębork County, Pomeranian Voivodeship, in northern Poland.

The village has a population of 212.

Notable residents
 Wilhelm Wetzel (1888–1964), Wehrmacht general

References

External links
Sarbsk Sea Park

Sarbsk